Mohamed Elbeltagy (born 1963) is an Egyptian physician and Muslim Brotherhood politician. He was a Member of Parliament from 2005 to 2010, and is currently the general secretary of the Freedom and Justice Party.

Biography
He was on board the MV Mavi Marmara during the 2010 Gaza flotilla raid.

After the 2013 Egyptian coup d'état, prosecutors ordered Elbeltagy's arrest on 10 July 2013. On 14 July 2013 Egypt's military-appointed prosecutor general Hisham Barakat ordered Elbeltagy's assets to be frozen.

Mohamed Elbeltagy's 17-year-old daughter Asmaa Elbeltagy was killed when the Egyptian security forces stormed two protest camps occupied by supporters of deposed president Mohamed Morsi in Cairo. She was shot in the back and chest.

Elbeltagy was arrested on 29 August 2013 by security forces in Giza. On 29 October 2013, a three-judge panel at Cairo Criminal Court stepped down from the proceedings, citing "uneasiness" over the trial. On 7 December 2013, Cairo's Criminal Court refused to return a verdict and recused itself in a case involving Elbeltagy and Safwat Hegazi citing "embarrassment" as a reason for its decision. On 11 December 2013, a second panel of judges withdrew from the trial. On 21 April 2015, a guilty verdict was returned against ELbeltagy over violence against protesters, and he was sentenced along with former President Mohamed Morsi and several other Muslim Brotherhood leaders to 20 years in prison.

References

External links 

www.alertnet.org article

1963 births
Living people
Members of the Parliament of Egypt
Members of the Egyptian Constituent Assembly of 2012
Egyptian Muslim Brotherhood members
Freedom and Justice Party (Egypt) politicians
20th-century Egyptian physicians
21st-century Egyptian physicians
20th-century Egyptian politicians
21st-century Egyptian politicians